Understanding Pediatric Heart Sounds 2nd edition (2003) by Steven Lehrer is a book and audio CD that guides the student through the skills of pediatric heart auscultation. It provides a complete overview of pediatric heart examination, anatomy, physiology, and pathology. The audio CD presents and explains normal and abnormal heart sounds.

References

External links
 Understanding Pediatric Heart Sounds on Google Books

Academic works about pediatrics
Audible medical signs
Symptoms and signs: Cardiac